The Circuito Interior Bicentenario ("Bicentennial Inner Loop") or more commonly, Circuito Interior or even more simply Circuito, is a 42-km-long (26 mi) urban freeway (in parts) and at-grade boulevard (in others), forming a loop around the central neighborhoods of Mexico City. It was built starting in 1961. The Circuito Interior received the appellation Bicentenario (Bicentennial) after a renovation that took place in 2010, Mexico's bicentennial year.

History
In 1951, 8 km (5 mi) of the Río Consulado river's course between the Monumento a la Raza and Mexico City Airport was put underground and the route was opened as a highway. Regent Ernesto P. Uruchurtu decided upon the routing underground of more stretches of the rivers Río Consulado, Río Churubusco and Río de la Piedad. An 18-km (11.2 mi) route was completed in 1961. In 1974, the Circuito was extended to the south and west, which according to sources at the time resolved 50% of the intersections with severe traffic congestion, with the support of the additional controlled-access roads Río San Joaquin and Parque Vía, together with the construction of the feeder roads Tacuba, Los Hongos and Chapultepec. Its eastern and western parts were finished in 1976.

Section names
Along its course, each section of the Circuito has a specific name:

Boulevard Puerto Aéreo (from Norte 184 to Avenida Fray Servando Teresa de Mier)
Avenida Río Consulado (from Norte 184 to Insurgentes Norte)
Paseo de las Jacarandas (from Insurgentes Norte to Ricardo Flores Magón)
Avenida Instituto Técnico Industrial (from Ricardo Flores Magón to Ribera de San Cosme)
Calzada Melchor Ocampo (from Ribera de San Cosme to Paseo de la Reforma)
Maestro José Vasconcelos (from Paseo de la Reforma to Eje 4 Sur Benjamín Franklin)
Avenida Revolución (southbound) and Avenida Patriotismo (northbound) (from Eje 4 Sur Benjamín Franklin to Molinos)
Avenida Río Mixcoac (from Molinos to Insurgentes Sur)
Avenida Río Churubusco (from Insurgentes Sur to Viaducto Río de la Piedad)
Avenida Jesús Galindo y Villa (from Viaducto Río de la Piedad to the junction with Avenida Fray Servando Teresa de Mier)

References

Highways in Greater Mexico City